William "Kedar" Massenburg (born 1963) is an American record producer and record label executive, who was the president of Motown Records from 1997 to 2004. Massenburg is best known for bringing Erykah Badu to fame. He trademarked the term "neo soul."

Massenburg is the founder, president and CEO of Kedar Entertainment.

Early life and education
William "Kedar" Massenburg was born in 1963. Massenburg is a 1981 graduate of Erasmus Hall High School in Flatbush, Brooklyn, New York and a 1986 graduate of Central State University in Wilberforce, Ohio.

Career
After college, Massenburg spent several years in marketing positions, including two years as a district manager for PepsiCo (maker of Pepsi Cola), and a year with SmithKline Beecham Clinical Labs Pharmaceuticals.

In 1995, he established Kedar Entertainment, originating out of his New York home, with a $1,700 outlay from his own pocket and consisted of a desk set, fax machine, copier, and portable phone. He became President and CEO. Involved in artist management, he directed the career of the pioneering rap group Stetsasonic for a time.

By 1994, Massenburg was negotiating artist contracts to the tune of more than $1 million a year. His own salary was in six figures, and he had hired two assistants, one of them working out of a satellite office in Los Angeles. Massenburg later expanded his activities into production, music publishing, and publicity. Massenburg was also responsible for signing the young rapper A+, and Freestyle Fellowship as well as Erykah Badu to their first major recording contracts. He was also involved in the production of Chico Debarge's Long Time No See album which received high acclaim after Debarge's release from prison.

D'Angelo
Massenburg started managing the soul singer D'Angelo. The singer's debut single "Brown Sugar" had done well at radio on Massenburg's East Coast home turf, but had failed to get crucial West Coast airplay. EMI worked with Massenburg and flew dozens of West Coast radio programmers and their dates, into New York for a D'Angelo performance, and for upscale dining and lodging accommodations. He later told the Minneapolis Star Tribune, "Was it worth it to spend the money to fly all those programmers in? Absolutely! We saw a substantial increase in radio airplay immediately after the show."

Erykah Badu
In 1995, Kedar Entertainment signed one of its first artists: Erykah Badu. Massenburg's work on behalf of Badu got him wide notice in the industry. His first move was to pass out 1,000 copies of Badu's debut single, "On & On", at the 1996 Soul Train Music Awards. "And man, when I heard it banging out of somebody's car going down the street that same night, I knew I had something." Badu embodied the new approach Massenburg was looking for.

Neo Soul
Massenburg wanted to start a genre that acknowledged the influence of hip-hop and of other electronics-influenced musical styles, but was a return to earlier forms.

Kedar Beverages LLC
Massenburg founded Kedar Beverages LLC in 2005, which makes chardonnay, merlot and cabernet sauvignon.

Personal life
As an adult, he has lived on the Upper West Side of Manhattan and in Saddle River, New Jersey.

He currently has 3 children: Kayla Massenburg, Eliana Massenburg and Elijah Massenburg

References

Living people
African-American musicians
American music industry executives
Record producers from New York (state)
Erasmus Hall High School alumni
Motown
1964 births
Date of birth missing (living people)
People from Flatbush, Brooklyn
21st-century African-American people
20th-century African-American people